Rajeev Parameshwar (born 9 June 1974) is an Indian actor and former model who has done several films, music albums and television serials in Malayalam. He has done over 30 serials and 10 films in his career spanning around two decades. His notable works include Prakash in Ente Manasaputhri , Sooraj in Kavyanjali, Mahi in Vanambadi, Balakrishnan Pillai in Santhwanam and Karthik Krishna in Mouna Raagam (Tamil). He is also noted for his role as Dasan Maash in the 2010 Malayalam film Paappi Appacha.

Biography
Rajeev was born to Parameshwaran and Sathi Devi
Married to Deepa and has two kids Sivanya and Atharv. He started his career as a model and has done print and commercial advertisements with R. Madhavan, Lenaa and Vidya Balan. Rajeev made his acting debut in the Malayalam film Swayamvara Panthal. He became a familiar face through East coast music albums, the same year he acted in Malayalam serial Preyasi alongside Kaviyoor Ponnamma and later playing the lead roles in serials like Oomakkuyil, Venalmazha, Kavyanjali and Omanathingal Pakshi established himself as a lead actor in Malayalam Television. He has appeared in films such as Nidra, Paappi Appacha and The Metro.

Television
Partial list of Television Serials
All films are in Malayalam, unless otherwise noted.

 Reality Shows as Contestant
Munch stars (2013) - Asianet
Star Wars (2018) - Surya TV
Telefilm
Kaanappurangal
Music Albums
Ninakayi
Mithadhu Madeedu Jadeedu

Filmography

References

External links
 

Male actors in Malayalam television
Living people
1977 births
Tamil male television actors
Male actors from Thrissur
Male actors in Malayalam cinema